Pauline Soullard (born ) was a French female volleyball player, playing as a central. She was part of the France women's national volleyball team.

She competed at the 2011 Women's European Volleyball Championship. On club level she played for Béziers Volley.

References

External links
http://www.cev.lu/Competition-Area/PlayerDetails.aspx?TeamID=7915&PlayerID=6999&ID=564
http://www.worldofvolley.com/News/Latest_news/France/11950/pauline-soullard-interview.html

1985 births
Living people
French women's volleyball players
People from Cholet
Sportspeople from Maine-et-Loire